The American Indian Quarterly is a quarterly peer-reviewed academic journal covering studies on the indigenous peoples of North and South America. It is published by the University of Nebraska Press and was established in 1974. The editor-in-chief is Lindsey Claire Smith (Oklahoma State University).

External links 
 

University of Nebraska–Lincoln
Native American studies
American studies journals
Publications established in 1974
Quarterly journals
English-language journals
1974 establishments in Nebraska